Paeonia × suffruticosa is a name used for a group of cultivars of tree peonies that are the result of hybridisation with species exclusively belonging to the subsection Vaginatae. Plants belonging to this group have been cultivated for millennia in China, initially only as a source of traditional Chinese medicine particularly the skin of its roots. Already early on the plant was also cultivated for its ornamental value, and it is highly revered in Chinese culture.

Genetic analysis 
Paeonia × suffruticosa is the name used for most tree peony cultivars, but is not a naturally occurring species. So it can be regarded as the name for a man-made hybrid swarm. Genetic analysis has shown that five species of the subsection Vaginatae together make up the parentage of the tree peony cultivars created before World War II. In over three quarters of the almost fifty studied cultivars, the DNA of their chloroplasts is identical to that in Paeonia cathayana, indicating that this species is the original maternal parent. Almost all of the remaining cultivars has chloroplast DNA identical to that in P. qiui, and rarely from P. ostii and partially from Paeonia rotundiloba. In the nuclear DNA however, homology with Paeonia rockii is largest, with lesser contributions from P. qiui, P. ostii, P. cathayana and P. jishanensis. Paeonia decomposita is the only species from the Vaginatae that has not contributed to these cultivars.

Lemoine hybrids 
Crossbreeding of yellow-flowered P. delavayi with traditional double-flowered P. × suffruticosa cultivars by Victor Lemoine in Nancy has led to the introduction of the color yellow into the cultivated double-flowered tree-peonies. These hybrids are known as the Paeonia × lemoinei group, and include double-flowered ‘Chromatella’ (1928), ‘Alice Harding’ (1935) and semidouble-flowered ‘Sang Lorraine’ (1939). The semi-double, lemon-yellow P. × lemoinei cultivar ‘High Noon’ has gained the Royal Horticultural Society’s Award of Garden Merit.

Itoh cultivars 
In 1948 horticultulturist Toichi Itoh from Tokyo used pollen from ‘Alice Harding’ to fertilize the herbaceous P. lactiflora ‘Katoden’, which resulted in a new category of peonies, the Itoh or intersectional cultivars. These are herbaceous, have leaves like tree peonies, with many large flowers from late spring to early summer, and good peony wilt resistance. Some of the early Itoh cultivars are ‘Yellow Crown’, ‘Yellow Dream’, ‘Yellow Emperor’ and ‘Yellow Heaven’.

Cultivated hybrid tree peonies originate from China and its surrounding areas, possessing significant cultural meaning throughout Chinese history. Currently there are about 600 Chinese tree peony cultivars. Since its introduction abroad, a few unique cultivar groups have been bred in France, Britain, the United States, and some other countries. This species is less common in U.S, but it can generally be found in plant nurseries.

Comparison with other peonies

Paeonia × suffruticosa, also known as the tree peony, originates from China. Sometimes, people refer to these tree peonies as “Chinese tree peonies.”

Paeonia × suffruticosa belongs to the peony family. The most distinctive feature is that Paeonia × suffruticosa is a bush or a tree, whereas most peonies are herbaceous. Despite their classification as trees, it is the flowers that attract people's attention. Peonies are generally slow to grow and have flowers that only last briefly and are fragile under weather conditions such as wind, rain or hot temperatures. In comparison, Paeonia × suffruticosa, as a tree, survives longer than the rest of the peonies. The woody stems of tree peonies allow the plant to survive in winter. In general, the plant is long-lived, and the flowers bloom longer in the early spring.

Etymology of scientific name 
The name Paeonia × suffruticosa is derived from two different sources. The genus name Paeonia derives from the name Paeon. In Greek mythology, Paeon was a disciple of the god of medicine, Ascleplus.  The species name "suffruticosa" is composed of two parts. The first part "suf-" is only a prefix; the second part "fruticosa", means shrub-like.

Cultivation 
In order to propagate the bush, the seeds are collected in June when the seed pods split. They are air-dried for a few days and are then stored in moist soil before planting out during autumn. If the pods are fully dried out, it is more difficult for the seeds to sprout. Seeds that are harvested late or allowed to dry completely will not produce roots until the following spring and then do not send up shoots for another year. Ideally, the plant should be planted in fertile, humus-rich soil with plenty of organic matter (in USDA zones 3 to 8).

Paeonia × suffruticosa grows in both full sun to dappled shade. However, the plant blooms best in dappled shade with 3 to 4 hours of sunlight. When grown in full sun, it is essential to provide adequate moisture to the plant. Generally, the tree requires very little pruning, but it is necessary to cut off dead branches, and to cut off any sprouts that are suckers from the herbaceous root stock.

Potential cultivating diseases include  Ca. Phytoplasma solani, the causal agent of the Black wood disease of grapevine. This is associated with tree peony yellows disease in China.

Significance in Chinese culture 

 
Paeonia × suffruticosa has always had an important status in both Chinese politics and culture. During the Qing Dynasty (1644 -1911), the government in 1903 appointed Paeonia × suffruticosa as China’s national flower. However, with political shifts and other factors, its title as the national flower was later replaced. In 1929, the plum tree was granted the title of national flower by the Republic of China (the government at the time).

Despite its loss of status of being the national flower, Paeonia × suffruticosa maintains cultural significance. In China, it is generally known as the “king of flowers”, symbolizing honor, wealth, and aristocracy, as well as love, affection, and feminine beauty. The tree peony has been frequently portrayed in significant Chinese works of literature and art.

China’s debate on the national flower 
The People’s Republic of China has not yet chosen a national flower. Potential candidates include Paeonia × suffruticosa, as well as the plum blossom, the chrysanthemum, the orchid, and the lotus. Paeonia × suffruticosa and the plum blossom are currently the front-runners. Comparisons by cultural importance are inconclusive as to which flower is the most symbolic of China, as all these flowers have been portrayed with roughly equal frequency through centuries of literature and art.

Elections for the national tree and national flower were held in the 1980s and 1994, but both elections ended with no final conclusion. Prior to the 2008 Beijing Olympics and 2010 Shanghai World Expo, the Chinese government again attempted to determine a national flower. Many Chinese citizens suggested copying the practices of countries such as France, Japan, and Thailand, by selecting two national flowers. 62 scholars from the Chinese Academy of Sciences and the Chinese Academy of Engineering have proposed a “dual national flower” plan to name both Paeonia × suffruticosa and plum blossom to the position.

With the Olympics and Expo approaching, the ongoing uncertainty over choosing a national flower led to the Chinese government publishing The Recommendation Concerning Setting the Peony and Plum Blossom as National Flowers as Early as Possible. The Recommendation pointed out that the lack of a  flower is hindering the expansion of China’s flower culture and industry.  This proposal was only one of several potential plans; other plans included choosing one, four, or five national flowers. The five flowers suggestion, known as “One Country, Five Flowers”, proposed establishing Paeonia × suffruticosa as the primary national flower, with four supplementary flowers representing each season of the year: the chrysanthemum would represent autumn, the plum blossom would represent winter, the orchid would represent spring, and the lotus would represent summer. Despite the proposals, China was not able to make a decision before the Olympics and Expo. The decision remains undecided.

As medicine
Paeonia × suffruticosa has a long history of being used in Chinese medicine. There are more than 1000 Chinese tree peony cultivars with various flower colors and flower forms that have been selected artificially for medicinal uses for more than 2000 years. The root bark, often referred to as Mu Dan Pi or Cortex Moutan, is the main part that is used in Chinese medicine. Mu Dan Pi’s main functions include reducing heat, cooling the blood, improving liver function, and mildly invigorating the blood. Mu Dan Pi of the best quality should be very fragrant, thick, white and starchy. The flower is now mostly cultivated for medicinal uses. Due to over-harvesting, the wild plant is threatened with extinction.

Chemistry 
Paeonia × suffruticosa contains paeonol, galloyl-paeoniflorin, galloyl-oxypaeoniflorin, suffruticoside A, B, C, D and E.

Gallery

References

External links 

Flora of China
suffruticosa
Hybrid plants